The 1890 Crescent Athletic Club football team was an American football team that represented the Crescent Athletic Club in the American Football Union (AFU) during the 1890 college football season. The team compiled a 6–4 record (3–1 against AFU opponents) and played its home games at Washington Park in Park Slope, Brooklyn, and the Crescent Club grounds in Bay Ridge, Brooklyn. 

William H. Ford was the team captain and center rush. Other key players included Harry Beecher at quarterback, Wyllys Terry at halfback, William T. Bull at fullback, and Henry J. Lamarche and Frederick J. Vernon in the rush line.

Schedule

References

Crescent Athletic Club
Crescent Athletic Club football seasons
Crescent Athletic Club Football